No. 6 is a Japanese novel series written by Atsuko Asano and published by Kodansha in nine volumes between October 2003 and June 2011. A manga adaptation drawn by Hinoki Kino was serialized in Kodansha's Aria magazine from January 2011 to November 2013. An 11-episode anime television series adaptation produced by Bones, was broadcast on Fuji TV's Noitamina programming block from July to September 2011.

Plot
The story takes place in a dystopian city known as "No.6". Shion, a boy raised in the elite and privileged environment of his home, gives shelter to another boy, who only gives his name as "Nezumi" (or "Rat") on the former's twelfth birthday. What Shion soon discovers is how drastically life will change after meeting with the mysterious Nezumi, with whom he had shared one unforgettable, stormy night.

Characters

Shion is an intelligent, idealistic boy who was on his way to going into the Special Curriculum for gifted students, specializing in Ecology, until his fateful encounter with Nezumi on his twelfth birthday. Although he knew Nezumi was a wanted fugitive, he cared for the bullet wound that on his shoulder, fed him, and sheltered him for the night in his room. Following a police investigation, he was punished for taking in a known fugitive and was stripped of his elite status in their caste-based society. He and his mother were forced to move from their elite home in Kronos to Lost Town and he was no longer allowed to enter the Special Curriculum.
Four years later, Shion, now 16, works for the Park Maintenance of No.6 where he controls waste management robots. One day, Shion and his coworker discover the body of an apparently old man in the park. When the man's death is not reported in the news, and Shion finds out that the body belonged to a man only 31 years old, he becomes suspicious of a government cover-up. Shion later witnesses his coworker age rapidly and die as a wasp emerge from his neck. Shion is then arrested under the pretense of being suspected for murdering his coworker. Nezumi saves him from the authorities and takes him to West Block, the slums outside the city. Shion nearly dies himself when he is infected with a parasitic wasp, but Nezumi saves him a second time, though Shion is left with white hair and a scar that looks like a red snake curling from his ankle to his neck. Later in the story, he works part-time for Dogkeeper. He is childhood friends with Safu, and his development generally centers on trying to come to terms with the underlying brutality of the world he lives in while still retaining his humanity.
While at first he thinks of Nezumi as his best friend, it later becomes apparent that he has begun to fall in love with him; Shion becomes slowly aware of this after spending some time speaking with Nezumi that resulted in Shion kissing the other. He dubbed it a 'good night kiss', which seemed to be more of a 'goodbye kiss' in order to confess his own feelings. They kiss again in the finale - with less confusion over whether it was romantically inclined - as they said their goodbye, with Shion deciding to patiently wait for him until the right time comes.

Nezumi is an intelligent, cynical boy around 16 years of age with a dark past. Four years ago, on his desperate run from No.6's police, he by chance found a house with an open window and went inside. Wounded and dripping wet, he met the room's occupant, Shion, a boy roughly his own age. Nezumi was shocked when Shion, despite understanding the danger of helping him and the lack of potential reward, treated his wound and sheltered him for the night. The next day he escaped to safety, and now lives outside of No.6 in the West Block.
When he learns that Shion is being forcibly transported to the Correctional Facility, he risks his life to save him. Together they escape to the West Block, where Nezumi lives by himself and allows Shion to stay with him. Nezumi usually hangs out alone and leaves Shion at home, he used to be a loner and Dogkeeper hints to him that he changed because of Shion.
Nezumi is a well-known actor/actress under the stage name Eve and is talented in singing, acting and dancing. His home is filled to the brim with books, most of which are classics. He often quotes these books on the spot (specifically Macbeth and Faust). He is a skilled fighter and has very honed 'street smarts'.
He despises the City of No.6, calling it a "parasitic city" and has spent years trying to find a way to destroy it. Later in the story, it is revealed that the government of No.6 perpetrated the genocide of his people, leaving him the sole survivor of his village.
He is shown to be very fond of Shion due to him being the very first person ever to treat him kindly, and after Shion's banishment from his old house, he starts to keep an eye on him to help him. While at first he had a small crush on him, his crush start to slowly turn into true love for Shion, which results in him in becoming greatly protective of him to the point that he does not want to risk scaring or traumatizing him. In the final episode, after Shion's apparent death, he falls into a deep depression, and chooses to stay with Shion as he accepts his own demise. Safu appears, singing Nezumi's song, which leads to Elyurias's destruction, Nezumi's wound healing, and Shion reviving. As they say their goodbyes, Nezumi passionately kisses Shion as he confesses his own feeling.

One of the residents of the West Block outside of No. 6. Dogkeeper is a brash kid who runs a run-down hotel and rents out many dogs as heaters during the winter. Dogkeeper has a number of shady businesses, including collecting items to sell from a contact within No.6's Correctional Facility. Dogkeeper was raised by a dog who they call "Mother", and cares deeply for dogs as a whole. Dogkeeper has a volatile relationship with Nezumi, who often goes to Dogkeeper to buy information. Dogkeeper sometimes asks Nezumi to sing for the dogs when they die to ease their suffering. Dogkeeper's gender is kept ambiguous. In the English translation, the other characters use masculine pronouns while referring to Dogkeeper, but there are hints in the novels that they might be assigned female.

Shion's childhood friend and a fellow resident of No.6. Like Shion, she is a child genius - her specialization is neurobiology. Early in the series, she goes to study abroad in the city No.5. Before leaving No.6, she asks Shion to have sex with her, but Shion refuses, saying he always thought of her as a friend, and to wait two years for him. Following the death of her grandmother, she returns to No.6. The time she spent in No.5 has changed her, and she begins to doubt that No. 6 is really the utopia she was brought up to believe. Later in the story she is kidnapped by the authorities and brought to the Correctional Facility to be used as a sample for the city's human experiments.

Shion's mother. Four years ago, she and Shion were sent to live in Lost Town, where she opened up a bakery. When Shion was declared by the authorities to be imprisoned for the crime of murder, she falls into despair. However, she learns of Shion's escape to West Block through correspondence with Nezumi, who is able to send short messages past the City's surveillance using his mice. Despite her worry for her son, she is determined to continue with her life, holding on to the belief that she and her son will one day be reunited.

One of the residents of West Block. An ex-journalist, he now runs a porn magazine. Behind closed doors, he also runs a prostitution service, pimping out girls for the officials of No.6, allowing him to live a life of luxury. He is a fan of Eve, Nezumi's stage persona, yet is less charitable towards Nezumi himself, who treats him with open disdain. In the past, he was in love with Karan, and has a soft spot for her son Shion.

Media

Novels
No.6 began as a novel series written by Atsuko Asano. Nine tankōbon volumes were published by Kodansha between October 10, 2003, and June 14, 2011. A special volume called No.6 beyond, which features stories from the lives of the characters before or after the main story, was published on November 22, 2012. Kodansha published nine bunkobon volumes from October 13, 2006, to July 15, 2014.

Manga
A manga adaptation, illustrated by Hinoki Kino, was serialized in Kodansha's shōjo manga magazine Aria from January 28, 2011, to November 28, 2013. Kodansha USA licensed the series in North America, and released the first volume in June 2013.

Anime
An anime television series adaptation produced by Bones and directed by Kenji Nagasaki, aired in Japan on Fuji TV's noitamina programming block from July 8 to September 16, 2011. Sentai Filmworks has licensed the anime for American audiences and it was released on both DVD and Blu-ray on August 21, 2012. Rights to the series expired in 2018.

References

External links
 Official website 
 No. 6 at Aniplex 
 

2003 Japanese novels
2010s Japanese LGBT-related television series
2011 manga
2011 anime television series debuts
Anime series based on manga
Aniplex
Bones (studio)
Dystopian anime and manga
Japanese LGBT-related animated television series
Japanese serial novels
Kodansha books
Kodansha manga
LGBT in anime and manga
Mystery anime and manga
Noitamina
Science fiction anime and manga
Sentai Filmworks
Shōjo manga